Anthony Hilario "Tony" Fernández (born April 29, 1982) is an American professional basketball player.

Fernandez graduated in 2000 from Holy Redeemer High School in Detroit. He was on the basketball and track and field teams. He played with the basketball team of the NAIA Aquinas College in Grand Rapids, Michigan in the 2002–03 season. At Aquinas, Fernandez also played long jump with the indoor track and field team in his freshman season (2000–01),

Playing career

And 1 Mixtape Tour

In 2005 shortly before Fernandez became a professional, he had a brief stint with the And 1 Mixtape Tour. After winning the dunk contest offered by And 1 in the summer of 2005 in Detroit, Fernandez got offered a tryout with the And 1 Mixtape Tour. He then proceeded to make the team. Two months after he joined And 1 he signed his contract with the Campeche Bucaneros thus leaving And 1.

Campeche Bucaneros
Starting in August 2005, Fernandez became a member of the Campeche Bucaneros, a professional basketball team in Campeche, Mexico. Fernandez ended up playing a total of five years for the Bucaneros before retiring from professional basketball in 2010.

Post playing career
In 2013, Fernandez began serving as an advisor to a Detroit startup company called 6th Man Apps. The company develops software for sports teams to help them calculate advanced statistics typically only found on professional levels of play. In a 2013 Crains Detroit Article by Amy Haimerl, one of 6th Man Apps products HoopMetrics, which is a basketball statistics program for the iPhone and iPad has nearly 750 monthly subscribing teams using the app. According to the article the purpose of HoopMetrics is to try to replicate the effect SaberMetrics had for baseball.

Currently, Fernandez remains an advisor and board member to 6th Man Apps. In 2013, he also became an advisor to Mattoon and Lee Equipment, an engineering company in Farmington Hills, Michigan.

Personal life
In 2008, Fernandez married Anaid Gabriela. Since then, Tony and Anaid have had three children. Tony Jr, Natalia, and Shia.

References

External links
Crains Detroit
Angel List
Game log, 2007-2008
Game log, 2008-2009
Game log, 2009-2010

1982 births
Living people
American men's basketball players
Aquinas College (Michigan) alumni
Basketball players from Los Angeles
Basketball players from Detroit
Bucaneros de Campeche players
College men's basketball players in the United States
Shooting guards
Small forwards
Holy Redeemer High School (Detroit) alumni